The 1987 Kansas City Royals season  was a season in American baseball. It involved the Royals finishing 2nd in the American League West with a record of 83 wins and 79 losses.

Offseason
 December 10, 1986: Scott Bankhead, Steve Shields, and Mike Kingery were traded by the Royals to the Seattle Mariners for Danny Tartabull and Rick Luecken.
 December 22, 1986: Alan Hargesheimer was released by the Royals.
 March 20, 1987: Derek Botelho was traded by the Cincinnati Reds to the Kansas City Royals for Eddie Tanner (minors) and Pete Carey (minors).
 March 27, 1987: David Cone and Chris Jelic were traded by the Royals to the New York Mets for Ed Hearn, Rick Anderson, and Mauro Gozzo.
 March 30, 1987: Jim Sundberg was traded by the Royals to the Chicago Cubs for Thad Bosley and Dave Gumpert.
 March 31, 1987: Larry Owen was signed as a free agent by the Royals.
 Billy Gardner is officially named the team's manager as Dick Howser's replacement during spring training.  Howser had contracted brain cancer the previous season and was relieved of duty at the All-Star break.  Howser attempted to return as manager for the season, but was physically incapable due to after-effects from his cancer treatments.

Regular season

Season standings

Record vs. opponents

Notable transactions
 June 2, 1987: Bret Barberie was drafted by the Royals in the 65th round of the 1987 Major League Baseball draft, but did not sign.

Notable events
 June 17, 1987:  Manager Dick Howser passes away from brain cancer.

Roster

Player stats

Batting

Starters by position
Note: Pos = Position; G = Games played; AB = At bats; H = Hits; Avg. = Batting average; HR = Home runs; RBI = Runs batted in

Other batters
Note: G = Games played; AB = At bats; H = Hits; Avg. = Batting average; RBI = Runs batted in

Pitching

Starting pitchers 
Note: G = Games pitched; IP = Innings pitched; W = Wins; L = Losses; ERA = Earned run average; SO = Strikeouts

Other pitchers 
Note: G = Games pitched; IP = Innings pitched; W = Wins; L = Losses; ERA = Earned run average; SO = Strikeouts

Relief pitchers 
Note: G = Games pitched; W = Wins; L = Losses; SV = Saves; ERA = Earned run average; SO = Strikeouts

Farm system

References

1987 Kansas City Royals at Baseball Reference
1987 Kansas City Royals at Baseball Almanac

Kansas City Royals seasons
Kansas City Royals
Kansas City